Muhammad Hidayat (born 26 April 1996), is an Indonesian professional footballer who plays as a defensive midfielder for Liga 1 club Persebaya Surabaya.

Career statistics

Club

Honours

Club 
Persebaya Surabaya
 Liga 2: 2017
 Liga 1 runner-up: 2019
 Indonesia President's Cup runner-up: 2019
 East Java Governor Cup: 2020

References

External links
 Muhammad Hidayat at Soccerway
 Muhammad Hidayat at Liga Indonesia

1996 births
Living people
Indonesian footballers
People from Bontang
Sportspeople from East Kalimantan
Persebaya Surabaya players
Liga 2 (Indonesia) players
Liga 1 (Indonesia) players
Association football midfielders